Seshadripuram Institute of Management Studies is a university-level institution in Bangalore, Karnataka, India. It was established in the year 2001 under the banner Seshadripuram Educational Trust.

External links

References 

Business schools in Bangalore
2001 establishments in Karnataka
Educational institutions established in 2001
Colleges in Bangalore